Mikania iodotricha is a species of flowering plant in the family Asteraceae. It is found only in Ecuador. Its natural habitats are subtropical or tropical moist montane forests and subtropical or tropical high-altitude grassland. It is threatened by habitat loss.

References

iodotricha
Flora of Ecuador
Near threatened plants
Taxonomy articles created by Polbot